Hossein Heydari (born 6 August 1998) is an Iranian football midfielder who plays for Chooka Talesh.

External links  
 Hossein Heydari at Soccerway    
 Hossein Heydari at PersianLeague.com

Club career

Esteghlal
He made his debut for Esteghlal in 27th fixtures of 2017–18 Persian Gulf Pro League against Meshki Pooshan while he substituted in for Jaber Ansari.

References

Living people
1998 births
Iranian footballers
Esteghlal F.C. players
People from Tehran
Association football midfielders